The 1870 Omata by-election was a by-election held on 27 April in the  electorate during the 4th New Zealand Parliament.

The by-election was caused by the resignation of the incumbent, Charles Brown.

He was replaced by Frederic Carrington.

Result
The following table gives the election result:

References

Omata 1870
1870 elections in New Zealand
April 1870 events
Politics of Taranaki